Dance Magic is a 1927 American silent drama film directed by Victor Halperin and starring Pauline Starke, Ben Lyon and Isobel Elsom.

Cast
 Pauline Starke as Johala Chandler
 Ben Lyon as Leach Norcutt
 Louis John Bartels as Jed Brophy
 Isobel Elsom as Selma Bundy
 Harlan Knight as Jahala's Father
 Judith Vosselli as Her Mother

References

Bibliography
 Munden, Kenneth White. The American Film Institute Catalog of Motion Pictures Produced in the United States, Part 1. University of California Press, 1997.

External links
 

1927 films
1927 drama films
1920s English-language films
American silent feature films
Silent American drama films
American black-and-white films
Films directed by Victor Halperin
First National Pictures films
1920s American films